The Music City Challenger is a tennis tournament held in Nashville, Tennessee, USA, since 2004. The event is part of the ATP Challenger Series and is played on indoor hard courts.

Past finals

Singles

Doubles

External links 
 
ITF search

ATP Challenger Tour
Hard court tennis tournaments in the United States